L'Aigle is a commune in the Orne department in Normandy in northwestern France. Before 1961, the commune was known as Laigle. According to Orderic Vitalis, the nest of an eagle (aigle in French) was discovered during the construction of the castle.

The river Risle flows through the commune. L'Aigle station has rail connections to Argentan, Paris and Granville.

Meteorite

On 26 April 1803 a meteoroid entered the Earth's atmosphere and air burst over L'Aigle.

Population

Heraldry

Events
 8 January 1354 : Assassination of the constable of France, Charles d'Espagne, by men of Charles the Bad, king of Navarre.
 26 April 1803 - meteorite falls.

Twin towns – sister cities

L'Aigle is twinned with:
 Aigle, Switzerland
 Clausthal-Zellerfeld, Germany
 Spišská Nová Ves, Slovakia

See also
 Communes of the Orne department
 L'Aigle station
 L'Aigle family

References

Communes of Orne
Meteorite falls